The World Rogaining Championships are the championships of the International Rogaining Federation (IRF) and the pinnacle rogaining event in the world. The championships are organised by the national rogaining organisation chosen by the IRF as the host of that particular championships.

World championship rogaines are always of 24 hours duration, and are conducted in accordance with standard rogaining rules.

The team with the highest score in each of the three gender classes (Men's, Women's and Mixed teams) are declared the World Rogaining Champions. Within each gender class, all teams participate in the Open age category. Additionally, there are age sub-categories as follows: Junior (under 20), Veteran (over 40), Super Veteran (over 55) and Ultra Veteran (over 65).
 
From 1992 to 2012 the World Rogaining Championships were held every two years, from 2012 to 2020 they have been held annually (with the exception of 2018), from 2020 onwards they will again be held biannually

History of the Championships

Multiple winners 

Men's
 Silver Eensaar - 3
 Rain Eensaar - 3
 David Rowlands - 3
 Chris Forne - 3
 Greg Barbour - 2
 James Russell - 2
 Timmo Tammemäe - 2

Women's
 Anastasia Shavlakova - 3
 Julie Quinn - 2
 Marina Galkina - 2
 Nina Mikheeva - 2

Mixed
 Raimonds Lapiņš - 2
 Anita Liepiņa - 2
 Guntars Mankus - 2
 Andrey Shvedov - 2

Overall
 Silver Eensaar - 3
 Rain Eensaar - 3
 Julie Quinn - 3
 David Rowlands - 3
 Chris Forne - 3
 Anastasia Shavlakova - 3
 James Russell - 2
 Natalija Abramova - 2
 Andrey Shvedov - 2
 Marina Galkina - 2
 Nina Mikheeva - 2
 Greg Barbour - 2
 Georgia Whitla - 2
 Greig Hamilton - 2
 Raimonds Lapiņš - 2
 Anita Liepiņa - 2
 Guntars Mankus - 2
 Timmo Tammemäe - 2

References

External links
 2WRC1996 Mt. Singleton, Australia
 7WRC2006 Warrambungles, Australia
 8WRC2008 Karula National Park, Estonia
 9WRC2010 Cheviot, New Zealand
 10WRC2012 Přebuz, Czech Republic 
 11WRC2013 Alol, Russian Federation
 12WRC2014 Black Hills, South Dakota, USA
 13WRC2015 Saariselkä, Finland
 14WRC2016 Alice Springs, Australia
 15WRC2017 Rāzna National Park, Latvia
 16WRC2019 La Molina, Catalonia
 17WRC2020 Sierra Nevada, California, USA

World championships in orienteering